The 2010 Western Athletic Conference (WAC) football season was an NCAA football season played from September 2, 2010 – January 9, 2011. The Western Athletic Conference in 2010 consisted of 9 members: Boise State, Fresno State, Hawaii, Idaho, Louisiana Tech, Nevada, New Mexico State, San Jose State, and Utah State.

Boise State, Hawaii, and Nevada all went 7–1 in conference play to share the WAC title. All three teams finished the regular season ranked in the top 25 of all four major polls. Boise State (12–1) was invited to the Maaco Bowl Las Vegas where they defeated Utah 26–3. Hawaii (10–4) was invited to the Hawaii Bowl where they lost to Tulsa 35–62. Nevada (13–1) was invited to the Kraft Fight Hunger Bowl where they defeated Boston College 20–13. The only other WAC team to be bowl eligible was Fresno State (8–5), and they were invited to the Humanitarian Bowl where they lost to Northern Illinois 17–40.

This was Boise State's final season as a WAC member. Amid a realignment of NCAA conferences, the school announced on June 11, 2010 that it would leave the WAC for the Mountain West Conference effective July 1, 2011.

Previous season 

Boise State went 13–0 during the regular season, their second straight undefeated season, to win the conference championship for the second straight year and seventh time in eight years. They would be ranked No. 6 in the BCS at the end of the regular season and received an invitation to the Tostitos Fiesta Bowl to become the first team from a non-automatic qualifying conference to receive an at-large berth to a BCS bowl (other non-AQ teams had received automatic bids under BCS rules). The Broncos faced BCS No. 4 ranked TCU in the first matchup of two teams from non-AQ conferences in a BCS bowl. They defeated the Horned Frogs 17–10 and finished the season No. 4 in AP and coache's polls.

Other bowl-eligible teams in 2009 were Nevada (8–4), Fresno State (8–4), and Idaho (7–5). Nevada was invited to play in the Sheraton Hawaii Bowl, where they lost 45–10 to SMU. Fresno State was invited to play in the New Mexico Bowl for the second straight year where they lost to Wyoming 35–28 in 2 overtimes. Idaho was invited to play in the Roady's Humanitarian Bowl where they defeated Bowling Green 43–42.

Spring ball

Preseason

WAC media days
During the WAC's football preview on July 26 in Salt Lake City, Boise State was selected by both the coaches and media as favorites to win the conference. They received 42 of a possible 43 first place votes in the media poll with Nevada coming in second and receiving the other first place vote. The Broncos received eight of nine first place votes in the coaches poll, but Boise State head coach Chris Petersen was not allowed to vote for his own team in first place, thus the Broncos received all 8 possible first place votes.

Boise State quarterback Kellen Moore was selected as the preseason offensive player of the year and Nevada defensive end Dontay Moch was selected as the preseason defensive player of the year. Moore and Moch were the 2009 WAC players of the year.

Media poll
 Boise State – 386 (42)
 Nevada – 333 (1)
 Fresno State – 300
 Idaho – 207
 Louisiana Tech – 200
 Utah State – 196
 Hawai'i – 166
 New Mexico State – 81
 San Jose State – 66

Coaches poll
 Boise State – 64 (8)
 Nevada – 55 (1)
 Fresno State – 50
 Utah State – 37
 Hawai'i – 36
 Idaho – 33
 Louisiana Tech – 26
 New Mexico State – 14
 San Jose State – 9

WAC vs. BCS matchups
WAC teams finished the season 5–9 against teams from BCS conferences. Boise State and Fresno State defeated two each with Nevada gaining the other win.

Regular season 

The WAC has teams in 4 different time zones. Times reflect start time in respective time zone of each team (Central-Louisiana Tech, Mountain-New Mexico State, Boise State, Utah State, Pacific-Idaho, Fresno State, San Jose State, Nevada, Hawaiian-Hawaii). Conference games start times are that of the home team.

Rankings reflect that of the USA Today Coaches poll for that week until week eight when the BCS poll will be used.

Week one 

Players of the week:

Week two 

Players of the week:

Week three 

Players of the week:

Week four 
ESPN's College GameDay broadcast from inside Bronco Stadium on the blue turf for the No. 3 Boise State vs Oregon State game. This is the first time that College Gameday was broadcast from a WAC school.

Players of the week:

Week five 

Players of the week:

Week six 

Players of the week:

Week seven 

Players of the week:

Week eight 

Players of the week:

Week nine 

Players of the week:

Week ten 

Players of the week:

Week eleven 

Players of the week:

Week twelve 

Players of the week:

Week thirteen 

Players of the week:

Week fourteen 

Players of the week:

All-WAC Teams

First Team

Offense
QB Kellen Moore–Boise State
QB Colin Kaepernick–Nevada
RB Doug Martin–Boise State
RB Vai Taua–Nevada
WR Austin Pettis–Boise State
WR Titus Young–Boise State
WR Greg Salas–Hawaii
TE Virgil Green–Nevada
OL Thomas Byrd–Boise State
OL Nate Potter–Boise State
OL Kenny Wiggins–Fresno State
OL Rob McGill–Louisiana Tech
OL John Bender–Nevada

Defense
DL Shea McClellin–Boise State
DL Ryan Winterswyk–Boise State
DL Chris Carter–Fresno State
DL Logan Harrell–Fresno State
DL Dontay Moch–Nevada
LB Winston Venable–Boise State
LB Ben Jacobs–Fresno State
LB Corey Paredes–Hawaii
LB Bobby Wagner–Utah State
DB George Iloka–Boise State
DB Jeron Johnson–Boise State
DB Mana Silva–Hawaii
DB Davon House–New Mexico State

Specialists
PK Kevin Goessling–Fresno State
P Bobby Cowan–Idaho
ST Phillip Livas–Louisiana Tech

Second Team

Offense
QB Bryant Moniz–Hawaii
RB Alex Green–Hawaii
RB Lennon Creer–Louisiana Tech
WR Jamel Hamler–Fresno State
WR Kealoha Pilares–Hawaii
WR Eric Greenwood–Idaho
WR Rishard Matthews–Nevada
TE Daniel Hardy–Idaho
OL Bryce Harris–Fresno State
OL Lupepa Letuli–Hawaii
OL Adrian Thomas–Hawaii
OL Chris Barker–Nevada
OL Ailao Eliapo–San Jose State

Defense
DL Billy Wynn–Boise State
DL Kaniela Tuipulotu–Hawaii
DL Aaron Lavarias–Idaho
DL Matt Broha–Louisiana Tech
LB Byron Hout–Boise State
LB Travis Brown–Fresno State
LB Adrien Cole–Louisiana Tech
LB James-Michael Johnson–Nevada
LB Kevin Smigh–San Jose State
DB Brandyn Thompson–Boise State
DB Desia Dunn–Fresno State
DB Shiloh Keo–Idaho
DB Isaiah Frey–Nevada
DB Curtis Marsh–Utah State

Specialists
PK Scott Enos–Hawaii
P Harrison Waid–San Jose State
ST Taveon Rogers–New Mexico State

Players of the year

Offense
Kellen Moore–Boise State
Colin Kaepernick–Nevada

Defense
Chris Carter–Fresno State

Freshman
Keith Smith–San Jose State

Coach of the year
Chris Ault–Nevada

Rankings
During the season Boise State, Hawaii, and Nevada were the only WAC teams to be ranked.

Bowl games

Attendance

Expanded WAC standings

References